A punch bowl is a vessel in which punch is served.

Punch bowl may also refer to:

Places
 Punch Bowl Falls, a set of waterfalls on Eagle Creek in Oregon, United States

Arts, entertainment, and media

Music
"Punch Bowl", 2008 song by Chris Thile and Punch Brothers from the album Punch
The Punch Bowl (album), 2002 album by Seth Lakeman

Other uses in arts, entertainment, and media
Pennsylvania Punch Bowl, a magazine published since 1899 at the University of Pennsylvania
Punchbowl.com, a free web-based online invitations service and digital greeting cards site
The Punch Bowl (1959 film), a 1959 East German film, the original German-language title of which is Maibowle

Pubs 
 Old Punch Bowl, a 15th-century timber-framed building in Crawley, England
 Punch Bowl Inn, Hurst Green, an 18th-century pub in Lancashire, demolished in 2021
 The Punch Bowl, Mayfair, a pub in Mayfair, London since the 1750s
 The Punch Bowl, York, a pub in Yorkshire which originated as a coffeehouse in 1675

See also
 Bowl (disambiguation)
 Devil's Punch Bowl (disambiguation)
 Punch (disambiguation)
 Punchbowl (disambiguation)